The 2015 European Pairs Speedway Championship was the 12th edition of the European Pairs Speedway Championship. The final was held in Debrecen, Hungary on 26 September. 

The title was won by Poland for the fifth time.

Final

See also 
 2015 Speedway European Championship

References 

2015
European Championship Pairs
Speedway European Championship